The Lola T333CS was a race car designed and built by Lola Cars for use in SCCA Can-Am Series racing and made its racing debut in 1977. The T333CS was highly successful; winning 21 races, and 3 championships with three different drivers, between 1977 and 1979. The Lola T333CS commonly used the 5.0-litre Chevrolet V8 engine.

References

External links
Lola Group

T333CS
Can-Am cars
Sports prototypes